is a Japanese professional basketball player for the Altiri Chiba of the B.League in Japan. He was selected by the Miyazaki Shining Suns with the third overall pick in the 2012 bj League draft. His nicknames are "Prince" in Akita and "Come on" in Toyama.

Career statistics

Regular season 

|-
| align="left" | 2011-12
| align="left" | TGI
|27||19||27||40.3%||38.5%||81.8%||2.7||0.5||0.6||0.4||9.4
|-
| align="left" | 2012-13
| align="left" | Miyazaki
|50||47||33||35.6%||33.7%||71.0%||1.0||1.4||0.7||0.1||12.6
|-
| align="left" | 2013-14
| align="left" | Akita
|52||51||26.1||38.9%||36.1%||75.8%||1.4||0.7||0.4||0.1||8.2
|-
| align="left" | 2014-15
| align="left" | Akita
|52||51||26.4||39.4%||36.9%||68.8%||1.7||1.6||0.7||0.1||8.8
|-
| align="left" | 2015-16
| align="left" | Akita
|52||52||32.0||38.8%||40.8%||75.0%||2.4||2.8||0.7||0.2||9.7
|-
| align="left" | 2016-17
| align="left" | Shibuya
|52||5||10.9||37.2%||37.1%||50.0%||0.5||0.2||0.2||0.0||3.3
|-
| align="left" | 2017-18
| align="left" | Toyama
|60||59||30.8||41.0%||39.7%||80.0%||1.5||1.5||0.5||0.2||9.3
|-
| align="left" | 2018-19
| align="left" | Toyama
|58||58||25.4||41.7%||37.8%||85.0%||1.6||0.9||0.4||0.1||9.2
|-
| align="left" | 2019-20
| align="left" | Kawasaki
|38||10||16.7||38.8%||35.6%||70.8%||0.8||0.8||0.5||0.0||5.5
|-

All-star games 

|-
|style="text-align:left;"|2019
|style="text-align:left;"|B.White
| 1 || 1 || 22.12 || .416 || .462 || .000 || 2.0 || 4.0 || 2.0 || 0 || 24.0
|-

Playoffs 

|-
|style="text-align:left;"|2013-14
|style="text-align:left;"|Akita
| 6 || 6 ||24.33  || .259  || .375 || .500 ||1.0 ||1.0 || 0.17|| 0 ||3.16
|-
|style="text-align:left;"|2016-17
|style="text-align:left;"|Shibuya
| 2 ||0  || 15.43 || .500 || .000 || .000 || 0.8 || 0 || 0 || 0 || 3.0
|-
|style="text-align:left;"|2017-18
|style="text-align:left;"|Toyama
| 4 ||4  || 24.49 || .382 || .214 || .600 || 0.8 || 0.5 || 0.5 || 0 || 8.0
|-
|style="text-align:left;"|2017-18
|style="text-align:left;"|Toyama
| 1 ||1  || 33.43 || .444 || .429 || .600 || 3.0 || 2.0 || 0 || 1.0 || 14.0
|-
|style="text-align:left;"|2018-19
|style="text-align:left;"|Toyama
| 2 || 2 || 28.20 || .412 || .333 || 1.000 || 1.0 || 0 || 0 || 0 || 9.5
|-

Early cup games 

|-
|style="text-align:left;"|2017
|style="text-align:left;"|Toyama
|3 || 3 || 28:02 || .360 || .278 || .833 || 1.0 || 0.3 || 0.33 || 0 || 9.3
|-
|style="text-align:left;"|2018
|style="text-align:left;"|Toyama
|2 || 2 || 24:02 || .550 || .500 || 1.000 || 0.5 || 1.0 || 0 || 0 ||15.5
|-
|style="text-align:left;"|2019
|style="text-align:left;"|Kawasaki
|2 || 1 || 20:56 || .278 || .250 || .000 || 1.0 || 1.0 || 0 || 0 ||6.5
|-

External links
Nayoro Basketball

References

1987 births
Living people
Akita Northern Happinets players
Altiri Chiba players
Japanese men's basketball players
Kawasaki Brave Thunders players
Miyazaki Shining Suns players
People from Nayoro, Hokkaido
Sportspeople from Hokkaido
Sun Rockers Shibuya players
TGI D-Rise players
Toyama Grouses players
Forwards (basketball)
Tokai University alumni